The 2022 United States Senate election in Oklahoma was held on November 8, 2022, to elect a member of the United States Senate to represent the State of Oklahoma. Incumbent Republican Senator James Lankford won re-election to a second full term, defeating cybersecurity professional Madison Horn (no relation to former U.S. Representative Kendra Horn, who ran for the Class II seat) by a landslide, carrying every single county in Oklahoma.

Lankford was first elected in 2014 special election with 68% of the vote, succeeding retiring Republican Tom Coburn. Lankford won re-election to a first full term in 2016 with 68% of the vote.

The primary elections for the Republican, Democratic, and Libertarian parties' nominations took place on June 28, 2022, with runoffs taking place on August 23, 2022. All candidates had to file between the days of April 13–15, 2022.

Republican primary 
On March 16, 2021, Jackson Lahmeyer announced his campaign for the Republican nomination for United States Senate seat held by James Lankford. While Lankford had not formally announced, he was expected to run for reelection. On April 6, Lankford officially announced he would seek reelection in an interview with the Tulsa World. The Oklahoman reported that Joan Farr announced her candidacy for the Oklahoma and Kansas U.S. Senate seats sometime in August. On September 28, state senator Nathan Dahm announced his campaign for Lankford's seat. In November the Tulsa World reported that Jessica Jean Garrison, the daughter of former state senator Earl Garrison, would also campaign in the contested Republican primary. On February 28, 2022, Nathan Dahm announced he had switched his campaign to the special election in the Class 2 seat. Jessica Jean Garrison also switched her campaign to the special election when filing. Lankford won the June primary with 67% of the vote.

Candidates

Nominee
James Lankford, incumbent U.S. Senator

Eliminated in primary
Joan Farr, independent candidate for the U.S. Senate in 2014 and 2020
Jackson Lahmeyer, pastor for Sheridan Church, former Oklahoma State Coordinator for Billy Graham Evangelistic Association, and former Crusade Director for Christ for All Nations

Withdrew before filing
Nathan Dahm, State Senator for the 33rd district (2013–present) (ran for the Class 2 U.S. Senate seat)
Jessica Jean Garrison, author, dietician, and daughter of former State Senator Earl Garrison (ran for the Class 2 U.S. Senate seat)

Endorsements
James Lankford and Jackson Lahmeyer courted the endorsement of Donald Trump, 45th president of the United States, but Trump did not endorse a candidate prior to the primary.

On June 29, 2021, Lankford's campaign published its supposed endorsement by state representative Kevin McDugle. McDugle later went on social media claiming to have never made the endorsement; Lankford's campaign subsequently removed his name from their endorsement list.

Debates
The Oil & Gas Workers Association of Oklahoma offered to host a debate for the Republican primary. Invitations were extended to candidates Jackson Lahmeyer and James Lankford, but Lankford refused the invitation.

Polling

Results

Democratic primary

Candidates

Nominee
Madison Horn, cybersecurity professional

Eliminated in runoff
Jason Bollinger, attorney and former State Department employee

Eliminated in initial primary
Arya Azma, security trader
Dennis Baker
Jo Glenn, attorney
Brandon Wade, machinery assembler

Failed to file
Bevon Rogers, businessman and 2020 candidate for Oklahoma Senate

Declined
Kendra Horn, former U.S. representative (running in the concurrent special election for the Class 2 seat)

First round

Results

Runoff

Results

General election

Predictions

Endorsements

Polling
Aggregate polls

Graphical summary

Results

See also 
 2022 United States Senate elections
 2022 Oklahoma elections
 118th United States Congress

Notes

References

External links 
 Official campaign websites
 Kenneth Blevins (L) for Senate
 Jason Bollinger (D) for Senate
 Michael Delaney (I) for Senate
 Madison Horn (D) for Senate
 James Lankford (R) for Senate

2022
Oklahoma
United States Senate